The LU domain (Ly-6 antigen/uPAR) is an evolutionarily conserved protein domain of the three-finger protein superfamily. This domain is found in the extracellular domains of cell-surface receptors and in either GPI-anchored or secreted globular proteins, for example the Ly-6 family, CD59, and Sgp-2.

A variety of GPI-linked cell-surface glycoproteins are composed of one or more copies of a conserved LU domain of about 100 amino-acid residues. Among these proteins, most contain only a single LU domain, though small numbers of exceptions are known; well-studied family member uPAR has three tandem LU domains.

Structure 
This domain folds into five antiparallel beta sheets, a structure common to the three-finger protein family. The domain typically contains ten well-conserved cysteine residues involved in five disulfide bonds, though some examples such as two of the three uPAR domains have fewer.

Examples 
Besides uPAR, other receptors with LU domains include members of the transforming growth factor beta receptor (TGF-beta) superfamily, such as the activin type 2 receptor; and bone morphogenetic protein receptor, type IA. Other LU domain proteins are small globular proteins such as CD59 antigen, LYNX1, SLURP1, and SLURP2.

Subfamilies
 Urokinase plasminogen activator surface receptor 
 Cell-surface glycoprotein Ly-6/CD59

Human proteins containing this domain
ARS;       CD177;     CD59;      LY6D;      LY6E;      LY6H;      LYNX1;   
LYPD2;     LYPD3;     LYPD4;     LYPD5;     LYPD6;  PLAUR;     PSCA;    
SLURP2;   SLURP1;    SPACA4;    TEX101;

Functions
Many LU domain containing proteins are involved in cholinergic signaling and bind acetylcholine receptors, notably linking their function to a common mechanism of 3FTx toxicity. Members of the Ly6/uPAR family are believed to be the evolutionary ancestors of the three-finger toxin (3FTx). Other LU proteins, such as the CD59 antigen, have well-studied functions in regulation of the immune system.

References 

Protein domains
Membrane proteins
Blood antigen systems
Transfusion medicine